KNCB-FM is a radio station broadcasting a classic country format in the Ark-La-Tex region.

History
KNCB-FM received its construction permit for 95.7 in 1990. The CP was extended multiple times in the 90s, with the station being moved to 105.3; it received its license to cover in 1997.

In 2012, the station was transferred to Gloria Dowd Herring and Ronald Dowd as co-administrators of Collins's estate. During this time, the KNCB stations encountered serious financial problems and temporarily went silent in order to avoid incurring further losses. In 2014, the KNCB stations were sold to MLS Broadcasting, a business of the Delgiorno family.

External links

Classic country radio stations in the United States
Radio stations established in 2002
Radio stations in Louisiana